Diego Valeri (January 25, 1887, Piove di Sacco - November 28, 1976) was an Italian poet and literary critic.

Bibliography

 Bibliografia 1926-1996: http://www.diegovaleri.it/fondo.html@act=5
 Antonello Nave, Il carme ‘Rodiginorum Goliardorum’ di Diego Valeri e Marino Cremesini, in “Quaderni per la storia dell’Università di Padova”, 36, 2003,   pp. 153-158.
Matteo Giancotti, Diego Valeri, Padova, Il Poligrafo, 2013.
Matteo Giancotti, Valeri, Diego, in Dizionario Biografico degli Italiani, Roma, Istituto dell'Enciclopedia Italiana, 97, 2020.
Antonello Nave, Diego Valeri e gli "Amici dell'Arte", in "Padova e il suo territorio", XXXVI, 211, giugno-luglio 2021, pp. 31-35.

References

Italian male poets
1887 births
1976 deaths
Italian-language poets
20th-century Italian poets
20th-century Italian male writers